aka Tora's Many-Splintered Love is a 1981 Japanese comedy film directed by Yoji Yamada. It stars Kiyoshi Atsumi as Torajirō Kuruma (Tora-san), and Keiko Matsuzaka as his love interest or "Madonna". Tora-san's Love in Osaka is the twenty-seventh entry in the popular, long-running Otoko wa Tsurai yo series. It was the first film in the series in which Hidetaka Yoshioka played the role of Tora-san's nephew Mitsuo Suwa.

Synopsis
When his travels bring him to Osaka, Tora-san falls in love with a local geisha. He helps her to track down her estranged brother, and informs his family that he plans to marry her. His plans are foiled when the geisha informs Tora-san that she is engaged.

Cast
 Kiyoshi Atsumi as Torajirō
 Chieko Baisho as Sakura
 Keiko Matsuzaka as Fumi Hamada
 Shimojo Masami as Kuruma Tatsuzō
 Chieko Misaki as Tsune Kuruma (Torajiro's aunt)
 Gin Maeda as Hiroshi Suwa
 Hidetaka Yoshioka as Mitsuo Suwa
 Hisao Dazai as Boss (Umetarō Katsura)
 Gajirō Satō as Genkō
 Chishū Ryū as Gozen-sama
 Kannosuke Ashiya as Kikai

Critical appraisal
Tora-san's Love in Osaka was the fifth top box-office money-maker in Japan for 1981. For her role in the film Keiko Matsuzaka was named Best Actress at the Japan Academy Prize and Blue Ribbon Awards. Kiyoshi Atsumi was nominated for Best Actor by the Japanese Academy.

Stuart Galbraith IV writes that Tora-san's Love in Osaka is an "above-average entry in this consistently excellent series". He points out that some of the film's humor may be lost on western viewers since it stems from the contrast between Tokyo and Osaka culture.
Director Yamada, according to Galbraith, "obviously favors rural, remote Japan to sprawling urban landscapes like Osaka," but nevertheless, "the film plays as a heartfelt valentine to the city and its people." The German-language site molodezhnaja gives Tora-san's Love in Osaka three and a half out of five stars.

Availability
Tora-san's Love in Osaka was released theatrically on August 8, 1981. In Japan, the film was released on videotape in 1986 and 1996, and in DVD format in 1998, 2002 and 2008.

References

Bibliography

English

German

Japanese

External links
 Tora-san's Love in Osaka at www.tora-san.jp (official site)

1981 films
1981 comedy films
Films directed by Yoji Yamada
1980s Japanese-language films
Otoko wa Tsurai yo films
Shochiku films
Films with screenplays by Yôji Yamada
Japanese sequel films
1980s Japanese films